The Gold Coast Blue Tongues (formerly the Brisbane Blue Tongues) was a semi-professional ice hockey team based in Bundall, Queensland, Australia. The team was a member of the Australian Ice Hockey League (AIHL). The Blue Tongues were founded in 2005 as an expansion AIHL team and played in the league for eight seasons between 2005 and 2012. The team’s home venue was Iceland Bundall, located on the Gold Coast, Queensland. The Blue Tongues never won any major titles and ceased operations in 2015.

History

Establishment
The Gold Coast Blue Tongues were founded in 2005 as the Brisbane Blue Tongues. The Blue Tongues were announced as an Australian Ice Hockey League (AIHL) expansion team along with the Central Coast Rhinos, increasing the league membership from six to eight teams. Originally located in Brisbane, the team’s first home venue was Iceworld Boondall. The team’s chosen name and logo was a nod to the native blue tongue lizard, commonly found in Brisbane and South-East Queensland. Garnet Radford was appointed the team's first general manager.

AIHL era

The Blue Tongues marked their inaugural AIHL game with a win on 23 April 2005. On the road in Canberra, Brisbane defeated the Canberra Knights 10-4 at the Phillip Ice Skating Centre. A goalless first period proved a poor indication for the goal rush that would follow in the second and third periods. Mark Barnsdale scored the Blue Tongues first ever goal, assisted by Kirk Raven and Chris Staneke. From that point the visiting Brisbane team scored four more unanswered goals before Matt Lehoczky gave the home fans something to cheer. The Blue Tongues continued their good second period showing in the third and once again out scored their more experienced opponents. Mikko Skinnari scored the tenth and final goal of the game for Brisbane with just over one minute remaining on the clock. Bryan Randall was the first Blue Tongues player to be sent to the penalty box, with a two-minute minor penalty for high sticking in the first period.

Brisbane finished their inaugural season in sixth position in the league standings with thirty-three points. They were five points off a finals qualification position and had a win percentage of 42%, having won twelve of twenty-six games. The Blue Tongues finished ahead of the Melbourne Ice and Central Coast Rhinos.

The following two years in Brisbane saw the Blue Tongues improve each season, finishing sixth and fifth in the standings, failing to qualify for the AIHL finals weekend on both occasions. The team was very close to qualifying in 2007 but fell three points short of finishing fourth after the team, along with two others, was handed a three-point penalty by the league for icing an illegible player. The Blue Tongues did sign two ex-NHL players during this time. First, in 2006, on 6 June, the team announced the signing of Rob Zamuner. Zamnuner had spent thirteen seasons playing in the NHL with teams such as Boston Bruins and Tampa Bay Lightning. Second, in 2007, the Blue Tongues secured the services of goaltender Tyrone Garner. Garner was a New York Islanders draft pick from 1998 and later played three games in the NHL for the Calgary Flames before a hockey career that took him around the globe.  

In 2008, the Blue Tongues appointed David Emblem as president and general manager. Emblem, originally from Montreal, Canada, stepped into the new role with the team possessing a vast hockey experience, having won two Goodall Cups and representing Australia at the World championships in the 1980’s. Emblem oversaw a period of great change for the team as they relocated to the Gold Coast, Queensland. The Blue Tongues new home venue would be Iceland Bundall, located in the Gold Coast suburb of Bundall. The reasons for the move were attributed to the team’s new sponsorship deal with Bartercard, who are headquartered on the Gold Coast, and for improving team integration between the Australian and import players. The Blue Tongues were also renamed the Gold Coast Blue Tongues (Bartercard Gold Coast Blue Tongues for sponsorship reasons). The move did present facility difficulties for the team and the AIHL. The small ice sheet at the rink, according to the rink owners, was never intended for senior ice hockey and there were consistent concerns raised about the suitability and safety of the venue by the league and traveling teams. Emblem did continue one Blue Tongues tradition of signing import players with NHL experience when he secured the services of one time Tampa Bay Lightining player Gaétan Royer for the 2008 AIHL season.

Despite the issues, in 2009, the Blue Tongues enjoyed their best season in the AIHL. They won fourteen of twenty-four regular season games and had a +22 goal difference that led them to finishing fourth in the league standings and qualifying for finals for the first time. For their maiden, and only, finals weekend, Gold Coast traveled to the Hunter Ice Skating Stadium in Newcastle. Playing in the second semi-final, the Blue Tongues faced the Newcastle North Stars, who had finished third in the regular season. In front of a 1,000 strong home crowd, the semi-final was a close game for the first two periods with both teams posting three goals each. However, Newcastle’s Canadian forward, Steven Kaye, proved the difference between the two teams and scored two unanswered goals in the third period to clinch his personal hat-trick and the win for the home team. The Blue Tongues were eliminated and missed out on advancing to the grand final to compete for the historic Goodall Cup. The three finals goal scorers for the Blue Tongues were Henrik Ivarsson, André Selander and Brad Smulders.

The Blue Tongues remained a consistent performer for the remainder of their time in the league, finishing fifth in 2010 and 2011 before finishing third in the Easton conference in 2012. Each time missing out on a return to finals. The Blue Tongues' Matt Amado did however set an AIHL goal scoring record in 2011. The duel Canadian/Portuguese import forward scored 42 goals in the regular season, beating the previous record of 39 set in 2007 by himself when the team was located in Brisbane.

Suspension and eventual demise

The issues raised with the Iceland rink when the team moved to the new location in 2008 had never been resolved. The situation led to tensions between the league, traveling teams, the Blue Tongues and the rink ownership. In 2011 and 2012, these issues came to a head when the Blue Tongues had to cancel two home games, against the Sydney Ice Dogs in 2011 and Melbourne Ice in 2012, due to the unsafe and unplayable ice surface at Iceland. These cancellations, led to the rink owner evicting the Blue Tongues from the venue and forcing them, at short notice, to seek alternative arrangements for the final seven AIHL home games in the 2012 season. The Blue Tongues managed to secure Iceworld Acacia Ridge in Brisbane for the final seven fixtures of the season, however, due to the limited ice time availability, the games would be scheduled for 10:30pm, despite the best negotiating efforts by the Blue Tongues to secure more appropriate ice time. The team confirmed this was only a temporary arrangement and that they intended to return to the Gold Coast when possible. The game that was abruptly halted on the Gold Coast vs the Melbourne Ice was rescheduled to be replayed in Melbourne at the Melbourne Icehouse, despite the Ice being within their rights to claim a forfeit victory. 

Following the conclusion of the AIHL season, In October 2012, the league along with the Blue Tongues jointly announced, through Deputy Commissioner Ben Kieley, the suspension of the Blue Tongues AIHL license for 2013. The team had explored different options for a home venue for 2013, including building a temporary professional rink on the Gold Coast or temporarily relocating to Brisbane, Erina or Perth, but had ultimately been unsuccessful in securing a financially viable and workable solution. The two parties committed to working together to explore all options to returning the Blue Tongues to competition in 2014, including building a new proposed $15 million twin-sheet ice sports facility on the Gold Coast.

In November 2013, it was revealed the situation to find a workable home venue for the Blue Tongues had not shifted and that the team’s license would remain suspended for the 2014 season. The team had continued its search for a new home and progressed the proposal for building a new ice sports stadium, with a business plan and architectural designs complete. The new aim is for the team to get back on the ice for the 2015 season. Dave Emblem had reportedly joined the Mayor’s Trade Mission to China and Taiwan to continue discussions with potential investors in building a new ice sports facility on the Gold Coast.

In 2015, the AIHL released its 2015 season game schedule, and the Gold Coast Blue Tongues did not feature. The Blue Tongues General Manager, Dave Emblem, had unsuccessfully continued to try and find a sponsor to build a new twin-sheet facility on the Gold Coast. He had also unsuccessfully taken the proposal to the local Council, who, despite some member interest, were unwilling to commit Government funding to the proposal. With no solution found in two years, the Gold Coast Blue Tongues’ AIHL license expired in 2015, ended the team’s involvement in top level ice hockey in Australia. The team then ceased operations.

Following the demise of the Blue Tongues, the AIHL canvased the Brisbane ice hockey community to gauge if there was any interest from another ownership group for a new team in the state’s capital.

Season-by-season record

1 As of the 2006 AIHL season, all games will have a winner.
2 The AIHL imposed the penalty of deducting 3 competition points to the Blue Tongues for playing unregistered player Jani Pekkarinen.

Honours

Franchise Awards

Each season the Blue Tongues held an annual awards night where the team awarded a number of players and members of the Blue Tongue hockey community.

References:

Players

Last roster

Team roster for the 2012 AIHL season

Notable former players
A list of players that have played at least one game for the Blue Tongues and who have also played at least one game in the National Hockey League (NHL).

References:

Franchise all-time player records
These are the top-five all-time player records in franchise history in the following categories: Appearance, points, penalty minutes and points per game.

Team staff
Current as of 2012 AIHL season.

Leaders

Team captains

The Blue Tongues had four captains in the team's history.

References:

Head coaches
The Blue Tongues had three head coaches in the team's known history. Head coaches for the years when the team was based in Brisbane (2006–07) are unknown.

References:

General managers
The Blue Tongues had two general managers (GMs) in the team's history.

References:

Team records

Broadcasting
TV and Streaming: 
Briz 31 (UHF Channel 31) (2007–08) – Domestic television broadcasting on the Brisbane community television station of all home games for the Blue Tongues in 2007 and 2008. The channel also broadcast the 2009 AIHL Finals weekend when the Blue Tongues qualified.

Self-broadcast (2008–09) – Domestic and international internet streaming broadcast of all Blue Tongues home games. The very first AIHL team to stream games via the internet. Produced by Blue Tongues supporter Mike Crowhurst from Cunning Crow Productions and commentated by Blue Tongues Team Assistant Adrian Barclay, games were available on www.slapshot.com.au.

References

External links

Gold Coast Blue Tongues Official website
AIHL official website

Australian Ice Hockey League teams
Ice hockey teams in Australia
Ice hockey clubs established in 2005
2005 establishments in Australia
Sporting teams based on the Gold Coast, Queensland